Crest Nicholson is a British housebuilding company based in Chertsey, Surrey. It is listed on the London Stock Exchange and is a constituent of the FTSE 250 Index.

History

1963-2000
The company was founded by Bryan Skinner in 1963 as Crest Homes and floated on the London Stock Exchange in 1968. One of the characteristics that differentiated Crest from most other housebuilders of the time was “not to hold large stocks of land”.

Crest’s first diversification was in 1969 when it bought En-Tout-Cas, the leading name in tennis court construction. More significant was the 1971 acquisition of Tony Pidgley’s earth moving business. Pidgley teamed up with Jim Farrer, a board member and originally the estate agent who had provided Skinner with his first land. These two ran Crest’s housing until 1975 when they left to form Berkeley Homes.

In 1972, a new holding company, Crest Securities, was formed to facilitate further diversification.  At the end of that year, Crest bought Camper & Nicholsons, the leading yacht maker, hence the change of name to Crest Nicholson. More unrelated acquisitions followed in the form of Lamson Engineering (1975), the spectacle makers Crofton (1979) and Greenwood Electronics (1983). Crest also bought the west-country construction firm of CH Pearce in 1985.

Bryan Skinner retired through ill health in 1983 and, gradually, much of the earlier strategy was reversed. Non-housing businesses were sold in the late 1980s and in the housing division Crest began to follow a policy of acquiring a long land bank.

2000-present
In 2007, the company was taken private after it accepted a £715 million offer from a consortium led by HBOS and Sir Tom Hunter, the Scottish entrepreneur. The company was re-listed on the London Stock Exchange in February 2013.

In 2010, subsidiary company Crest Nicholson (Londinium) Ltd. was party to a high court and Court of Appeal case which addressed the difference between the court's role in construing the terms of a contract which two parties had agreed, and its role in assessing whether an offer capable of acceptance had been made, and if so, whether it had been accepted.

In 2018, it was reported that the chief executive of Crest Nicholson had stepped down as the company reported growing profits. Stephen Stone who had been the boss of the housebuilder for 12 years became executive chairman and Patrick Bergin took his place.

In June 2018, it was reported that the company would be pulling back from London as a cost-cutting measure. It will close its central London office and will be less likely to buy land in London.

As a result of the company's lower profits, in January 2019, Crest Nicholson put a £400 million housing development in Hove on hold. The company's chief executive, Patrick Bergin, told The Times that "It would be imprudent of us to make a commitment on a scheme of that type when we’ve got limited visibility on future pricing."

In September 2019, the company appointed Peter Truscott as their new chief executive, adopting a new strategy to reduce overhead costs and reposition its margins.

In January 2020, Truscott said the company had over-concentrated on building off-site manufacturing capabilities, and would now focus on improving on-site operational efficiency and on introducing group-wide construction specifications to cut material buying costs. Poor financial performance was blamed on political uncertainty and the impact of the COVID-19 pandemic and led to the company consulting on 130 redundancies from its 966-strong workforce.

References

External links
Official site

Housebuilding companies of the United Kingdom
Companies based in Surrey
Construction and civil engineering companies established in 1963
Companies listed on the London Stock Exchange
1963 establishments in England